Gerolamo De Franchi Toso may refer to:
Gerolamo De Franchi Toso (1522–1586), Doge of Genoa
Gerolamo De Franchi Toso (1585–1668), Doge of Genoa